David Moran Wareham (June 18, 1924 – June 2, 1985) was an American professional basketball player. He played in the National Basketball League in four games for the Waterloo Hawks during the 1948–49 season and averaged 0.8 points per game.

References

1924 births
1985 deaths
American men's basketball players
Basketball players from Iowa
College men's track and field athletes in the United States
Guards (basketball)
Loras Duhawks men's basketball players
Sportspeople from Dubuque, Iowa
Waterloo Hawks players